Karl-Heinz "Kalle" Rummenigge (born 25 September 1955) is a German football executive and former professional player. He was the longtime Chairman of Executive Board of FC Bayern München AG, a daughter company of German Bundesliga team Bayern Munich.

As a player, Rummenigge had his greatest career success with Bayern Munich, where he won the Intercontinental Cup, two European Cups, as well as two league titles and two domestic cups. He also won two Ballon d'Or awards.

A member of the West Germany national team, Rummenigge won the 1980 European Championship and was part of the squad that finished runner-up in the 1982 FIFA World Cup and at the 1986 World Cup.

Rummenigge is a former chairman of the European Club Association, serving in that capacity from 2008 until 2017.

Club career

Rummenigge was born in Lippstadt, North Rhine-Westphalia.

He joined Bayern Munich in 1974, coming from the Westphalian amateur side Borussia Lippstadt, for a transfer fee of ca. €10,000. He immediately showed great strength as a dribbler. His scoring qualities were initially insignificant, but would find great improvement in later years, particularly after the arrival of coach Pal Csernai in 1979. In 1979–80, he scored 26 goals and became for the first time the Bundesliga's top striker, a feat he repeated in 1981 and 1984 with 29 and 26 goals, respectively.

With Bayern he won the European Cup in 1975 and 1976. In 1975, he did not take part in the final of the competition, whilst in the year thereafter a glass of brandy sufficiently prepared the nervous Rummenigge to contribute to the defeat of AS Saint-Étienne. In the same year he became also part of the team that prevailed in the Intercontinental Cup finals against Cruzeiro EC from Belo Horizonte.

In the era of coach Csernai he found in midfielder Paul Breitner a congenial partner and he formed such a formidable one-two-punch that they were only called Breitnigge (name invented by German newspaper Bild).

The club, then often dubbed as "FC Breitnigge", won in this period the Bundesliga title in 1980 and 1981, and the DFB-Pokal in 1982 and 1984. A renewed triumph in the European Cup was denied, when the club lost the 1982 final narrowly against Aston Villa. In the season before Rummenigge was top-scorer in this competition with 6 goals.

His substantial contribution to the successes of the club and the Germany national football team found also expression in personal honours. In 1980, he was named German Footballer of the Year and in 1980–1981 the European Footballer of the Year.

In 1984, aged 29, he was sold for a record fee of €5.7m to Inter Milan. Despite a notable beginning, in which he helped the team to compete until the end for the 1984–85 Scudetto, Rumenigge's career in Italy was mostly marred by injury problems. At the end of his contract in 1987, Rummenigge moved on to Swiss first division club Servette FC in Geneva, where he saw his career out. In his last season, 1988–89, he had his last success, becoming top scorer in the Swiss league with 24 goals.

International career

With the West German national team he took part in the 1978 World Cup in Argentina, 1982 World Cup in Spain and the 1986 World Cup in Mexico. In 1978, West Germany exited in the second group stage of the tournament. In 1982 and 1986, the team was runner-up behind Italy and Argentina, giving him the unique distinction of captaining the senior team to two silver medals in the FIFA World Cup.

Rummenigge also took part in two European Championship tournaments. In the 1980 competition in Italy, West Germany defeated Belgium in the final by 2–1 to win their second UEFA Euro.

Altogether, between 1976 and 1986, Rummenigge amassed 95 caps and scored 45 goals for West Germany, including one in extra-time in the 1982 World Cup semi-final victory over France, and one in the losing 1986 World Cup final match against Argentina. He also scored a hat-trick in a group stage game against Chile during the 1982 World Cup.

Style of play
One of the most talented attacking players of his generation, Rummenigge was often lauded as a highly versatile forward, capable of playing as a second striker, winger, or flat-out centre forward. His main strengths were his pace, dribbling, heading and goalscoring ability, from both close range and from outside the box. He also had a penchant for scoring from awkward situations.

Rummenigge was also praised for his both-footedness, leadership and physical strength. However, his later career was greatly affected by injuries, in particular after his move to Inter Milan.

Bayern Munich management

In autumn 1991, Bayern Munich invited Franz Beckenbauer and Rummenigge to return to the club as vice presidents. Rummenigge held this position until February 2002, when he was appointed Chairman of Executive Board of the newly corporatised football department of the club (FC Bayern München AG). According to the club, "in his role as chairman he is responsible for external relations, new media, board affairs and representing the holding company on national and international bodies." 

During his tenure, Bayern Munich managed to move to their new stadium, Allianz Arena. Oliver Kahn took over his CEO position at Bayern Munich from 1 July 2021.

Miscellaneous
In April 1983, the British pop duo Alan & Denise recorded a tribute song about his "sexy knees" in the song "Rummenigge". The single reached number 43 in German charts.

From 1990 until 1994, Rummenigge worked as a TV co–commentator for matches of the German national team.

In March 2004, he was named by Pelé as one of the top 125 greatest living footballers.

His brother Michael Rummenigge was also a noteworthy footballer. He played as forward for Bayern Munich and Borussia Dortmund from 1982 to 1988 and 1988 to 1994, respectively. He also represented Germany on two occasions between 1983 and 1986.

Rummenigge and his wife Martina have three sons and two daughters born between 1980 and 1991.

Rummenigge supports ending the 50+1 rule.

Career statistics

Club

International

Scores and results list West Germany's goal tally first, score column indicates score after each Rummenigge goal.

Honours

Bayern Munich
Bundesliga: 1979–80, 1980–81
DFB-Pokal: 1981–82, 1983–84
European Cup: 1974–75, 1975–76
Intercontinental Cup: 1976

West Germany
UEFA European Championship: 1980
FIFA World Cup runner-up: 1982, 1986

Individual
Kicker Bundesliga Team of the Season: 1977–78, 1978–79, 1979–80, 1980–81, 1981–82, 1982–83, 1983–84, 1991–92
Guérin Sportivo All-Star team: 1980, 1981, 1982, 1983, 1984
Bundesliga Top Goalscorer: 1979–80, 1980–81, 1983–84
Goal of the Year (Germany): 1980, 1981
Footballer of the Year (Germany): 1980
Guérin Sportivo Player of the Year. 1980
 UEFA European Championship Team of the Tournament: 1980
Ballon d'Or: 1980, 1981; runner-up: 1979
Onze d'Or 1980, 1981
Bravo Otto 1980, 1981, 1982, 1983, 1984
European Cup Top Goalscorer: 1980–81
FIFA World Cup Silver Shoe: 1982
FIFA World Cup Bronze Ball: 1982
FIFA World Cup All-Star Team: 1982
DFB Pokal Top Goalscorer: 1981–82
Swiss League Top Goalscorer: 1988–89
Swiss Foreign Footballer of the Year: 1988–89
FIFA 100
Bayern Munich All-time XI
Golden Foot, as football legend: 2009
'Best European Manager' at the Golden Boy Awards by Tuttosport: 2020
Italian Football Hall of Fame: 2021

Notes

References

External links

Karl-Heinz Rummenigge at fcbayern.de
Karl-Heinz Rummenigge at soccer-Europe.com

1955 births
Living people
People from Lippstadt
Sportspeople from Arnsberg (region)
Footballers from North Rhine-Westphalia
German footballers
Association football forwards
FC Bayern Munich footballers
Inter Milan players
Servette FC players
Bundesliga players
Serie A players
Swiss Super League players
UEFA Champions League winning players
UEFA Champions League top scorers
Kicker-Torjägerkanone Award winners
Ballon d'Or winners
FIFA 100
Germany B international footballers
Germany international footballers
1978 FIFA World Cup players
UEFA Euro 1980 players
1982 FIFA World Cup players
UEFA Euro 1984 players
1986 FIFA World Cup players
UEFA European Championship-winning players
West German expatriate footballers
West German expatriate sportspeople in Italy
West German expatriate sportspeople in Switzerland
Expatriate footballers in Italy
Expatriate footballers in Switzerland
German chief executives
FC Bayern Munich board members
West German footballers